"Mona Lisas and Mad Hatters" is a song written by English musician Elton John and songwriter Bernie Taupin, and performed by John. It was released on the 1972 album Honky Château. The lyrics conveyed Taupin's take on New York City after hearing a gun go off near his hotel window during his first visit to the city.
The song's lyrics were partly inspired by Ben E. King's "Spanish Harlem," written by Jerry Leiber and Phil Spector, in which he sings "There is a rose in Spanish Harlem." 

The song was also released as the B-side of the "Harmony" UK single in 1980.

Reception
Allmusic critic Stewart Mason noted that the song is "less saccharine than many similar Elton John and Bernie Taupin ballads" and praised the "somewhat uncharacteristic emotional directness" of its lyrics.

Rolling Stone magazine's Jon Landau praised the song when it was released, writing:

Performances
Elton John himself called the song "one of my all-time favourites" when introducing it at his 60th-birthday concert in New York's Madison Square Garden, as he performed it more than a hundred times in concert. 

John also delivered a heartfelt rendition of this song at The Concert for New York City at Madison Square Garden on 20 October 2001. The concert was meant primarily as a tribute for family members and fellow workers of New York's Fire and Police and Emergency Medical Services departments, who had been participating in the ongoing recovery efforts at the demolished World Trade Center complex following the terrorist attacks of 11 September 2001. John dedicated the song to the emergency workers and their families, as well as to New York City.

In popular culture
The song was used in the film Almost Famous, in a scene in New York City, highlighting the loneliness of Kate Hudson's character, who overdoses on Quaaludes and champagne.

Sequel

A more upbeat sequel to the song called "Mona Lisas and Mad Hatters (Part Two)" was recorded 16 years later for John's album Reg Strikes Back.

References

External links
Lyrics

1972 songs
Elton John songs
Pop ballads
Rock ballads
Songs about New York City
Songs with music by Elton John
Songs with lyrics by Bernie Taupin
Song recordings produced by Gus Dudgeon
1980 singles